Tribble is a surname. Notable persons with that surname include, in order of birth date (where known):
 Rev. Andrew Tribble (1741–1822), an early Baptist Preacher
 Samuel J. Tribble (1869–1916), a former U.S. Representative of Georgia's 8th Congressional District
 Charles Tribble (1942–2009), an American wrestler
 Keith R. Tribble (born 1955), a former CEO of the Orange Bowl Committee and athletic director of University of Central Florida
 DeJuan Tribble (born 1985), an American football player
 Bob Tribble, a professor at Texas A&M University with research interests in high energy nuclear physics and nuclear astrophysics
 Bud Tribble, a computer software developer
 Jeffery Tribble, an ordained elder in the African Methodist Episcopal Zion Church